Brummen is a municipality and a village in the eastern Netherlands.

Brummen has a  small railway station - Brummen railway station on the line between Zutphen and Arnhem. About two kilometers west of the village, on the edge of the Veluwe forest area,  lies the Engelenburg resort, a castle-like house. It is in use as a hotel for golf players and has a 9-hole golf-link.

Population centres
 Brummen
 Eerbeek (the largest village in the municipality)
 Empe (which has a small railway station on the line Apeldoorn-Zutphen)
 Hall - with an interesting chapel dating from the Middle Ages
 Leuvenheim
 Oeken
 Tonden
 Voorstonden

Gallery

Transportation

Brummen railway station is served by 2 trains per hour serving places such as Zutphen, Dieren, Arnhem and Nijmegen.

International relations

Twin towns — sister cities
Brummen is twinned with:

Notable people 
 Jan Elias Nicolaas Schimmelpenninck van der Oye (1836 in Brummen – 1914) a Dutch politician
 Cornelis Johannes van Doorn (1837 in Hall – 1906) a Dutch civil engineer and foreign advisor to Meiji period Japan
 Jacob Emil van Hoogstraten (1898 in Eerbeek – 1991) a Dutch public servant in the Dutch East Indies
 Dick Dolman (1935 in Empe – 2019) a Dutch politician

Sport 
 Geurt Schoonman (1896 in Brummen – 1971) a Dutch sports shooter, competed at the 1948 Summer Olympics
 Wiljon Vaandrager (born 1957 in Brummen) a former rower, bronze medallist at the 1984 Summer Olympics
 Stefan Groothuis (born 1981 in Empe) a retired Dutch speed skater, gold medallist at the 2014 Winter Olympics

Gallery

References

External links

Official website

 
Municipalities of Gelderland
Populated places in Gelderland